Chryseobacterium echinoideorum  is a Gram-negative, rod-shaped, aerobic and non-motile bacteria from the genus of Chryseobacterium which has been isolated from a sea urchin (Tripneustes gratilla) on the Penghu Island on Taiwan. Chryseobacterium echinoideorum produces flexirubin.

References 

echinoideorum
Bacteria described in 2015